The New Zealand bat flea (Porribius pacificus) is a threatened species of flea endemic to New Zealand. The species was first described in 1946 from samples collected near Masterton in 1915, and from chocolate wattled bats on Pelorus Island.

It is adapted to living with the New Zealand long-tailed bat; like this bat species, the flea's closest relatives are in Australia, and its ancestor is likely to have colonised New Zealand from Australia with its host within the last 2 million years. It has also been recorded as living on the New Zealand lesser short-tailed bat, but these occurrences are thought to be accidental.

The New Zealand bat flea was given the conservation status of "Nationally Vulnerable" by the Department of Conservation in 2015.

References

External Links 

 Porribius pacificus discussed on RNZ Critter of the Week, 1 October 2021

Fleas
Insects described in 1946
Endemic fauna of New Zealand
Insects of New Zealand
Vulnerable fauna of Oceania
Parasites of bats
Parasitic arthropods of mammals
Endemic insects of New Zealand